MV Finnland is a container ship launched in 2005.

References

Merchant ships of the United Kingdom
2005 ships